Qareh Poshtelu District is in Zanjan County, Zanjan province, Iran. At the 2006 National Census, its population was 17,153 in 3,934 households. The following census in 2011 counted 16,516 people in 4,421 households. At the latest census in 2016, the district had 15,969 inhabitants in 4,788 households.

References 

Zanjan County

Districts of Zanjan Province

Populated places in Zanjan Province

Populated places in Zanjan County